Milford Magazine, a regional lifestyle publication, was published from 2001 to 2009. It produced approximately 10 issues per year and was distributed to over 200 high-traffic locations by Pike Media Partners, a media startup co-owned by Sean Strub.  Krista Gromalski served as its Editor from 2001 through 2005.

While located in Milford, Pennsylvania, it was distributed throughout the Delaware River Highlands region: Pike, Wayne, and Monroe counties in Pennsylvania; the Orange and Sullivan counties in New York; and Sussex county of New Jersey.

Mission
Milford Magazine's editorial mission was to re-brand Milford and the northern Pocono Mountains area as a distinct region known as the Delaware River Highlands, and to distance it from the traditional Pocono brand.  The magazine's tagline was Navigating the Delaware River Highlands.

Awards
Milford Magazine received a 2005 Community Service Award from the Upper Delaware Council in recognition of the publication's mission to cover topics of importance within the Delaware River Valley.

References

2001 establishments in Pennsylvania
2009 disestablishments in Pennsylvania
Lifestyle magazines published in the United States
Local interest magazines published in the United States
Defunct magazines published in the United States
Magazines established in 2001
Magazines disestablished in 2009
Magazines published in Pennsylvania